Adrian Severin (born 28 March 1954) is a Romanian politician and former Member of the European Parliament.

Adrian Severin started his politics career under the Communist rule, as Instructor (lector) at Ștefan Gheorghiu Academy, the university for Romanian Communist cadres.  After the regime change, he became a member of the National Salvation Front and the Democratic Party (which he left in April 1999). Severin was the Minister of Foreign Affairs of Romania between 12 December 1996 and 29 December 1997 as part of the Victor Ciorbea cabinet. He sat in the Chamber of Deputies in June–July 1990 before resigning, and again was a member of that body from 1992 until December 2007, when he resigned.

He is a member of the Social Democratic Party, part of the Group of the Party of European Socialists, and became an MEP on 1 January 2007 with the accession of Romania to the European Union. Previously, Severin served as the UN Special Rapporteur on Human rights in Belarus from 2005 to 2006. He was member of PACE from 1993 till 1997 and from 2003 till 2007.

In 2011 the European Parliament opened a formal investigation into alleged corruption by Severin and two other MEPs, based on an investigation conducted by journalists of the Sunday Times weekly (part of The Times of London). The Romanian politician insisted he had done nothing that was "illegal or against any normal behavior". Mr. Severin is accused of accepting bribe in exchange for initiating some law amendment, and is recorded on video by the journalists when requesting and accepting the bribe. Subsequently, he was called by the Leader of the SD Group in the European Parliament to resign. As he refused, he was suspended from his position as Deputy-Leader of the SD Group and had to leave this Parliamentary Group.

He was indicted by Romania's anti-corruption agency in September 2013 and in February 2016, a court sentenced him to three and a half years in prison, although he may still appeal the judgement.

Although he was sentenced to three and a half years imprisonment for corruption, Adrian Severin ran at the 2016 local elections for the office of Mayor of Bucharest on a Social Justice Party (whose chairman is Marian Vanghelie) ticket. He received 8234 votes (1.43%).

See also 
 List of corruption scandals in Romania

External links
European Parliament profile
European Parliament official photo
 Severin's report to PACE on rights of national minorities in Latvia, 2006
 Severin's reports on human rights in Belarus: 2005 (E/CN.4/2005/35),2006 (E/CN.4/2006/36), 2007 (A/HRC/4/16)

References

 

1954 births
Living people
Politicians from Bucharest
Democratic Liberal Party (Romania) politicians
Social Democratic Party (Romania) politicians
Members of the Chamber of Deputies (Romania)
Romanian Ministers of Foreign Affairs
United Nations special rapporteurs
University of Bucharest alumni
Social Democratic Party (Romania) MEPs
MEPs for Romania 2007
MEPs for Romania 2007–2009
MEPs for Romania 2009–2014
Romanian politicians convicted of corruption
Romanian officials of the United Nations